Baldwin of Ibelin (died 21 February 1267) was the fourth of five sons of John I of Beirut and his second wife Melisende of Arsuf.

He commanded the third battaile at the Battle of Agridi in 1232. In 1246, he was appointed Seneschal of Cyprus and was taken captive at the Battle of Mansurah in 1250.

Baldwin married Alix, daughter of Walter III of Bethsan and Theodora Comnena Lathoumena. She was called la Seneschalece and she gave him six children:
John, married Isabelle du Rivet
Philip, Constable of Cyprus
Guy, married Maria, daughter of Hetoum I of Armenia and Isabella, Queen of Armenia
Balian, married Marguerite Visconte
Hugh, regent of Cyprus in 1306
Melisende, died young

Notes

References

Sources

Christians of the Sixth Crusade
1267 deaths
House of Ibelin
Year of birth unknown
People of the Kingdom of Cyprus